Alauda is a genus of larks found across much of Europe, Asia and in the mountains of north Africa, and one of the species (the Raso lark) endemic to the islet of Raso in the Cape Verde Islands. Further, at least two additional species are known from the fossil record. The current genus name is from Latin alauda, "lark". Pliny the Elder thought the word was originally of Celtic origin.

Taxonomy and systematics
The genus  Alauda was introduced by the Swedish naturalist Carl Linnaeus in 1758 in the tenth edition of his Systema Naturae. The type species was subsequently designated as the Eurasian skylark.

The genus Alauda has four extant and at least two extinct species. Formerly, many other species have also been considered to belong to the genus.

Extant species
The genus contains four species:

Extinct species
 †Alauda xerarvensis (late Pliocene of Varshets, Bulgaria)
 †Alauda tivadari (late Miocene of Polgardi, Hungary)

Former species
Previously, some authorities also classified the following species (or subspecies) as species within the genus Alauda:
 Greater hoopoe-lark (desertorum) (as Alauda desertorum)
 Gray's lark (as Alauda grayi)
 Short-clawed lark (as Alauda chuana)
 Cape long-billed lark (as Alauda curvirostris)
 Dusky lark (as Alauda nigricans) 
 Rufous-rumped lark (as Alauda erythropygia)
 Desert lark (as Alauda deserti)
 Middle East desert lark (as Alauda isabellina)
 Bar-tailed lark (arenicolor) (as Alauda arenicolor)
 Senegal chestnut-backed finch-lark (as Alauda melanocephala)
 Ashy-crowned sparrow-lark (as Alauda grisea)
 Congo Sabota lark (as Alauda plebeja)
 Bradfield's lark (as Alauda naevia)
 Pink-breasted lark (as Alauda poecilosterna)
 Karoo lark (as Alauda albescens)
 Karoo lark (codea) (as Alauda codea)
 Karoo lark (guttata) (as Alauda guttata)
 Dune lark (as Alauda erythrochlamys)
 Eastern clapper lark (as Alauda fasciolata) 
 Cape clapper lark (as Alauda apiata)
 Woodlark (as Alauda arborea)
 Botha's lark (as Alauda fringillaris)
 Pink-billed lark (as Alauda conirostris)
 Sykes's lark (as Alauda Deva)
 Large-billed lark (as A. magnirostris)
 Crested lark (as Alauda cristata)
 Senegal crested lark (as Alauda senegallensis)
 Crested lark (leautungensis) (as Alauda leautungensis)
 Indian crested lark (as Alauda Chendoola)
 Malabar lark (as Alauda malabarica)
 Horned lark (as Alauda alpestris)
 Mexican horned lark (as Alauda chrysolaema)
 Shore lark (as Alauda flava)
 Southern horned lark (as Alauda Penicillata)
 Temminck's lark (as Alauda bilopha)
 Mongolian short-toed lark (as Alauda Dukhunensis)
 Red-capped lark (as Alauda cinerea)
Red-capped lark (spleniata) (as Alauda spleniata)
 Greater short-toed lark (as Alauda brachydactila)
 Steppe greater short-toed lark (as Alauda longipennis)
 Bimaculated lark (as Alauda bimaculata)
 Calandra lark (as Alauda calandra)
 Black lark (as Alauda yeltoniensis)
 Mongolian lark (as Alauda mongolica)
 Dupont's lark (as Alauda Duponti)
 Mediterranean short-toed lark (as Alauda rufescens)
 Sand lark (as Alauda raytal)

References

External links

 
Bird genera
Taxa named by Carl Linnaeus